Academic American Encyclopedia is a 21-volume general English-language encyclopedia published in 1980. It was first produced by Arête Publishing, the American subsidiary of the Dutch publishing company VNU (later acquired by Nielsen Media Research in 1999).

Arête Encyclopedia 
The initial product, Arête Encyclopedia, was created on a schedule that was too tight resulting in many difficulties. The first Vice President of Editorial, Larry Lustig, came from Encyclopaedia Britannica and found the pressure too great. He was replaced by Michael Reed who came from World Book Encyclopedia. Reed asked several times to have the production schedule lengthened to straighten out what had already been produced and assure reasonable time for completion. After six months, with no schedule change, Reed resigned rather than have his name associated with the work.

Grolier acquired the encyclopedia in 1982. It has also been published under the names Grolier Academic Encyclopedia, Grolier International Encyclopedia, Lexicon Universal Encyclopedia, Macmillan Family Encyclopedia, Barnes & Noble New American Encyclopedia, and Global International Encyclopedia.

An abridged version was known as the Grolier Encyclopedia of Knowledge.

The full text of the encyclopedia was available to 200 homes in Columbus, Ohio in 1980, as part of an experiment sponsored by OCLC. A year later, the text was available to subscribers of The New York Times Information Bank, the Dow Jones News/Retrieval and CompuServe.

Arête Publishing's interactive version, including illustrations, video and audio stored on videodisk was shown at the Frankfurt Book Fair in 1982.

Electronic version 
Grolier published the text-only 1985 CD-ROM The Electronic Encyclopedia from Grolier, based on the Academic American Encyclopedia, which comprised 30,000 entries and 9 million words. In 1990, when it was called The New Grolier Electronic Encyclopedia (1988–1991), still pictures were added. This evolved into the 1992 The New Grolier Multimedia Encyclopedia, later named the Grolier Multimedia Encyclopedia.

The CD-ROM version features a search function and offers the complete text of the Academic American Encyclopedia, including illustrations, photographs, animated maps, music and videos.

In co-operation with The Software Toolworks company was created The Software Toolworks Illustrated Encyclopedia.

See also
Grolier Multimedia Encyclopedia
Lists of encyclopedias
KnowledgeSet

References

External links
Grolier online

English-language encyclopedias
American encyclopedias
1980 non-fiction books
20th-century encyclopedias
21st-century encyclopedias